Kilsoo Kenneth Haan (Korean: 한길수, Hanja: 韓吉洙, May 31, 1900 – July 1, 1976) was a Korean Nationalist, intelligence operative, anti-Japanese agitator, and both the source and translator of Kinoaki Matsuo’s contested and controversial book, The Three-Power Alliance and a United States-Japanese War (English: How Japan Plans to Win).

Early life
Haan was born in Chang Dan, Korea on May 31, 1900. He was five years old when his family joined the Korean immigration to Hawaii as plantation laborers. Despite his father leaving for Korea in 1910, he and his mother remained in Hawaii, where Haan continued his education. He attended the Korean Compound School and the Ka'iulani School until the 8th grade.

In August 1920, Haan left Hawaii to spend a year preparing for the ministry at the Salvation Army Training School in San Francisco, California. Upon his return, he began his service as a Salvation Army representative on the island of Kaua'i. Haan rose through the ranks over the following six years to make Captain.

Haan's religious career ostensibly came to an end in 1926 when he married a Korean woman from Honolulu named Stella Yoon and resigned from the Salvation Army, reportedly because his new wife's religious beliefs were in conflict with his service in the Salvation Army. After resigning, the couple returned to Honolulu.

Career
In the 1930s, Haan became involved with the Korean independence movement by joining the Korean National Association (KNA) of Hawaii.

Pearl Harbor controversy
On May 5, 1943, Haan appeared before Chairperson Samuel Dickstein’s House Immigration Committee on the repeal of the Chinese Exclusion Law. He gave testimony that his network of spies in East Asia had discovered evidence of the Japanese government's plan to end the war in China and re-deploy its naval assets to convoy a force of over 100,000 seasoned troops to invade Crescent City, California, "before Christmas".

Legacy
Haan's personal papers can be found in the University of California, Santa Cruz archives.

In media

Haan (film)

The South Korean spy thriller film Haan was released in 2005 based on Haan's experience as Korea's first notable double agent. The film follows Haan as he learns of Japan's impending attack on Pearl Harbor in 1941 and tries to warn the United States, but is ignored.

Selected publications
Books translated
 How Japan Plans to Win. Boston: Little, Brown and Co. (1942). — An English translation of The Three-Power Alliance and a United States-Japanese War (in Japanese), by Kinoaki Matsuo.

Further reading
Books
 Grodzins, Morton (1949). Americans Betrayed: Politics and the Japanese Evacuation. Chicago: University of Chicago Press. .
 Kim, Richard S. (2011). The Quest for Statehood: Korean Immigrant Nationalism and U.S. Sovereignty, 1905–1945. New York: Oxford University Press. .

Reviews
 Chamberlain, William Henry (Apr. 26, 1942). "A Pep Talk for the Japanese." Review of How Japan Plans to Win, by Kinoaki Matsuo. The New York Times, section BR, p. 18.
 Woolbert, Robert Gale (Jul. 1942). Review of How Japan Plans to Win, by Kinoaki Matsuo. Foreign Affairs, vol. 20, no. 4, p. 785.
Ainger, E. (Sep. 1942). Review of How Japan Plans to Win, by Kinoaki Matsuo. International Affairs Review Supplement, vol. 19, no. 9, pp. 519–520. .

References

Bibliography
 Caprio, Mark E. (2014). "The Eagle has Landed: Groping for a Korean Role in the Pacific War." Journal of American-East Asian Relations, vol. 21, no. 1, pp. 5-33.
 Kim, Richard S. (2011). The Quest for Statehood: Korean Immigrant Nationalism and U.S. Sovereignty, 1905–1945. New York: Oxford University Press. .
 Koster, John (2019). Action Likely in Pacific. Gloucestershire: Amberley Publishing. .

External links
 Kilsoo Haan at Densho Encyclopedia
Fred E. Cannings Pearl Harbor materials, 1933–1978 — Contains correspondence by Haan and Cannings with U.S. government officials regarding the Pearl Harbor attack and Japanese activities in Korea. Stored at the University of Wyoming American Heritage Center. 

1900 births
1976 deaths
Korean nationalists